The Koraiyar River is a river in the Ambasamudram taluk of the Tirunelveli district of the Indian state of Tamil Nadu. It is a right-bank tributary of the Thamirabarani River, which flows through Tirunelveli and Thoothukudi districts. It is formed by the confluence of the minor Vadakkur Koraiyar and Therkku Koraiyar rivers, which are its headwater streams, on the eastern slopes of the Western Ghats. It flows for a total length of  before flowing into the Kannadian channel near the village of Vellankuli upstream of the Kannadian anicut. The channel bypasses the anicut before joining the Thamirabarani downstream and to the east of the dam. Along its course it is joined by three tributaries, the Vandal Odai,
Elumichaiyar, and Koppuraiyar rivers.

References

See also 
List of rivers of Tamil Nadu

Rivers of Tamil Nadu
Geography of Tirunelveli district
Rivers of India